The 2010 CONCACAF Under-17 Women's Championship was held in Costa Rica from March 10–20, 2010. This was the second edition of the U-17 women's championship for CONCACAF. The first and second placed teams qualified for the 2010 FIFA U-17 Women's World Cup held in Trinidad and Tobago. The United States were the defending champions from 2008. Trinidad and Tobago did not participate because they automatically qualified to the World Cup as hosts.

Media coverage
Like the 2010 CONCACAF Under-20 Women's Championship held in January, Concacaf.tv broadcast each game in live stream free of charge. Fox Soccer Channel and Fox Sports en Espanol broadcast group games that involved Mexico or the United States as well as all knockout stage matches regardless of participants.

Qualified teams

Group stage
All times are local (UTC−06:00).

Group A

Group B

Knockout stage
All times are local (UTC−06:00).

The winners of the two semifinal matches qualified for the 2010 FIFA U-17 Women's World Cup held in Trinidad and Tobago.

Semi-finals

Third place play-off

Final

Winners

Goalscorers
USA's Horan won the top-scorer award with 8 goals.
8 goals
 Lindsey Horan

6 goals

 Morgan Brian
 Taylor Smith

3 goals

 Raquel Rodríguez
 Maria Moreira
 Diana González
 Tanya Samarzich
 Isabel Farrell
 Havana Solaun
 Kaili Torres

2 goals

 Nour Ghoneim
 Alhyssa Villalta
 Lucero Luna
 Kaysie Clark
 Alexandra Doll

1 goal

 Haisha Cantave
 Kylie Davis
 Sabrina Hémond
 Kinley McNicoll
 Diamond Simpson
 Alyssa Chin
 Angélica Fallas
 Fabiola Sánchez
 Shantel Bailey
 Trudi Carter
 Shenika Williams
 Anakaren Llamas
 Christina Murillo
 Fernanda Piña
 Daniela Alejandra Salcedo
 Andrea Sánchez
 Lindsay Alveo
 Olivia Brannon
 Jennifer Gonzalez
 Cari Roccaro

References
Notes

Citations

External links
Official Site

2008
Women's
2010
CON
2010 in American women's soccer
2010 in Canadian women's soccer
2009–10 in Mexican football
2009–10 in Costa Rican football
2009–10 in Jamaican football
2009–10 in Panamanian football
2010 in youth sport
2010 in youth association football